Schismatoclada is a genus of flowering plants belonging to the family Rubiaceae.

Its native range is Madagascar.

Species
Species:

Schismatoclada aurantiaca 
Schismatoclada aurea 
Schismatoclada bracteata 
Schismatoclada citrifolia 
Schismatoclada concinna 
Schismatoclada coursiana 
Schismatoclada farahimpensis 
Schismatoclada homollei 
Schismatoclada humbertiana 
Schismatoclada longistipula 
Schismatoclada lutea 
Schismatoclada marojejyensis 
Schismatoclada psychotrioides 
Schismatoclada pubescens 
Schismatoclada purpurea 
Schismatoclada rubra 
Schismatoclada thouarsiana 
Schismatoclada viburnoides 
Schismatoclada villiflora

References

Rubiaceae
Rubiaceae genera